PowerBASIC, formerly Turbo Basic, is the brand of several commercial compilers by PowerBASIC Inc. that compile a dialect of the BASIC programming language. There are both MS-DOS and Windows versions, and two kinds of the latter: Console and Windows. The MS-DOS version has a syntax similar to that of QBasic and QuickBASIC. The Windows versions use a BASIC syntax expanded to include many Windows functions, and the statements can be combined with calls to the Windows API.

History
The first version of the DOS compiler was published as BASIC/Z, the very first interactive compiler for CP/M and MDOS. Later it was extended to MS-DOS/PC DOS and in 1987 Borland distributed it as Turbo Basic.

Turbo Basic was originally created by Robert "Bob" Zale (1945–2012) and bought from him by Borland. When Borland decided to stop publishing it (1989), Zale bought it back from them, renamed it PowerBASIC and set up PowerBASIC Inc. to continue support and development of it; it was later called PBDOS.

PowerBASIC went on to develop BASIC compilers for Windows, first PBWIN — their flagship product — and then PBCC, described below.

On November 6, 2012, Robert Zale, the creator of PowerBASIC, died. For a time, it was assumed that the company might cease operations. His wife, Vivian Zale, posted on 8 March 2014 to the PowerBASIC forums a statement that the company would continue in operation. On May 10, 2015, Vivian Zale announced that work was continuing on new versions of PowerBASIC compilers.

On November 2, 2016, Vivian Zale announced her intention to seek a buyer for the company.

On January 31, 2017, Adam Drake announced Drake Software had acquired the PowerBASIC source code from PowerBASIC, Inc., with the intention of updating and improving the functionality of the product. This was later confirmed by Vivian Zale with a forum post thanking the members for their support.

When Bob Zale died, PBWin11 and PBCC7 were in beta testing, and 64-bit compilers and PB/Pro (PBWin and CC in one compiler) were in the alpha stages. However, development of PowerBASIC products has stopped. No new version has been released since v10.03 (11 years ago as of May 2022). No 64-bit version or beta release has been announced. No development activity has been reported. No corrections (such as adding the correct DPI settings for the IDE) have been released. PowerBASIC Tools LLC still sells new licenses for the 32-bit Windows compilers.

Compilers
PowerBASIC programs are self-contained and use no runtime file to execute. In all versions of the compiler, the applications compile without external libraries, though it can use such libraries if needed. PBDOS creates 16-bit DOS MZ executable files, while PBWIN and PBCC create 32-bit Portable Executable (PE) files.

Turbo Basic
Borland's Turbo Basic contains extensions to classic BASIC (without breaking compatibility), such as a drawing API and mouse access.

Unlike most BASIC implementations of its time, Turbo Basic was a full compiler which generated native code for MS-DOS. Other implementations were either interpreters, or relied heavily on a runtime library. The integrated development environment could run a BASIC program internally for traditional BASIC debugging (see sample below), or generate an MS-DOS stand-alone executable file that could be run on other systems without the Turbo Basic product or runtime libraries.

Code example

The following program is an example of the ALGOL-like BASIC dialect that Turbo Basic supported. Unlike traditional BASIC, which used line numbers and had limited control structures and no support for ALGOL-like subroutines, modern BASIC dialects starting at this period were extended to make the language compatible with modern structured programming style by making line numbers optional and adding the control structures and subroutine definitions needed for structured programming.

INPUT "What is your name?: ", n$
PRINT "Hello "; n$
DO
  s$ = ""
  INPUT "How many stars do you want to print"; s
  FOR i = 1 TO s
    s$ = s$ + "*"
  NEXT i
  PRINT s$
  DO
    INPUT "Do you want to print more stars"; q$
  LOOP WHILE LEN(q$) = 0
  q$ = LCASE$(LEFT$(q$, 1))
LOOP WHILE q$ = "y"
PRINT "Goodbye "; n$

(s$ is a string and s is a single-precision floating-point (number). They are separate variables.)

Like the other Borland products of this era, the code executes within the integrated development environment.

PowerBASIC for DOS (PBDos)
PBDOS includes an integrated development environment (IDE) and supports DOS 3.30 and all later versions.

PowerBASIC Console Compiler (PBCC)

PBCC is a 32-bit compiler for the Windows 9x series and Windows NT series of operating systems, including Windows XP, Windows Server 2008, Windows Vista, and Windows 7. PBCC applications can use dynamic-link libraries (DLLs). The compiler comes with an IDE including an editor and stepping debugger.

No knowledge of Windows programming is required to create character mode or graphical applications with this compiler. PBCC-compiled executables can also be used as Common Gateway Interface executables (for web servers).

PBCC creates only executables, not DLLs. (PBWin — see below — can create both.)

PowerBASIC Compiler for Windows (PBWin)
PBWin is a 32-bit compiler compatible with the Windows 9x series and the Windows NT series of operating systems, including Windows XP, Windows Server 2008, Windows Vista, Windows 7, Windows 8 (8.1), and Windows 10. PBWin can create dynamic-link libraries. PBWin applications can read dynamic-link libraries]. PBWin comes with a compiler, IDE with editor, and stepping debugger.

Dynamic Dialog Tools (DDT)
You can create an application's graphical user interface using the Windows API, or by using the built-in DDT language extensions. The group of BASIC statements which wrap Windows API functions, particularly in the creation and handling of dialog boxes and child controls, is collectively known as Dynamic Dialog Tools. Using DDT requires less coding than to create a similar program using the Windows API. Using the DDT and the Windows API (known as SDK style as in Microsoft Windows SDK) are not mutually exclusive.

Trial versions of compilers
PowerBASIC renamed PBWin v9.07 and PB/CC v5.07 as "Classic PBWin" and "Classic PB/CC", respectively, and on November 1, 2016, offered them for a short time through their online store as free, no-nag, trial versions along with PBForms v1.0 (PowerBASIC Forms).

Tools

PB Forms
PowerBASIC Forms, available for purchase separately, is a graphical user interface design tool add-on for PBWin. It automatically produces source code using the DDT language extension that creates forms using the Windows graphical user interface.

COM Browser
The PowerBASIC COM Browser, which comes with PBWin, is an application that exposes the interfaces, methods, and properties of COM objects, as described by type-library files. The PowerBASIC COM Browser exports an interface structure of a COM object for early-binding purposes in PowerBASIC code, and gives syntax reference and context-help on the interface members exposed by a COM object.

Programming language

Characteristics
PowerBASIC is a native-code BASIC compiler whose reported merits are simplicity of use and speed compared to other languages.
Although the compiled code is fast enough for most purposes, the compilers also support inline assembler which can be used for hand optimization of critical routines. The Windows compilers (PBWin & PBCC) support almost all of the x86 instruction set, including FPU, SIMD, and MMX, the main exceptions being a few which are useful mostly to systems programmers. One can insert any unsupported instructions by inserting their opcodes with the "db", "dw", and "dd" statements. Lines of assembler code can be freely interspersed with lines of BASIC code, although one must always consider the potential interactions between the two types of code.

Hello world
Hello world is used to give a very small example of the syntax used by a programming language and is often the smallest possible program for any given programming language.

Here is an example of a PBCC hello world program. By default PBCC creates a console window at runtime for displaying output. The use of Waitkey$ in this example prevents the console window from automatically closing until the operator sees the displayed text.

Function PBMain

  Print "Hello, World!"
  Waitkey$

End Function

Here is the PBWin version, which displays a Windows "dialog" message box.

Function PBMain

  MsgBox "Hello, World!"

End Function

Object-oriented programming
PBWin and PBCC support object-oriented programming in the form of COM classes, however the compilers do not force you to use OOP, it is merely an option. In-process and out-of-process COM Servers can also be built using these compilers.

Graphics
Both the Console Compiler and Windows Compiler can create graphic windows. The GRAPHICs statements are higher-level than Windows' Graphics Device Interface (GDI) library functions.

Elements of the GRAPHIC statements
GRAPHIC WINDOWS are dedicated dialogs each containing a single control which fills the dialog's client area. GRAPHIC controls are child windows which support the same GRAPHIC drawing functionality as GRAPHIC windows. GRAPHIC BITMAPS are also defined, again supporting the GRAPHIC drawing functionality, but as purely memory objects, like Windows bitmaps or DIB sections. Keyboard and mouse handling statements are included among the GRAPHIC statements. Character output to a GRAPHIC target uses fonts specified via the FONT NEW statement.

Creating a GRAPHIC WINDOW application
A GRAPHIC WINDOW is the equivalent of a Windows dialog box containing a static control on which drawing operations can be done. A single BASIC statement will create a GRAPHIC WINDOW and specify its size, position and title. It is not essential to specify a WNDPROC for the GRAPHIC WINDOW. A short source code example for a complete GRAPHIC WINDOW application follows:
#Compile Exe ' using either PBCC6 or PBWIN10 compiler
#Dim All

Function PBMain
    Local GW As Dword
    ' start a GRAPHIC WINDOW
    Graphic Window New "graphic window", 100, 100, 200, 200 to GW
    ' show a coloured disc
    Graphic Ellipse (10, 10)-(190, 190), %rgb_Red, %rgb_SeaGreen, 0
    ' wait for a keypress
    Graphic Waitkey$
End Function

Comparison of PB GRAPHIC statements with the GDI API
Using PB GRAPHIC statements, a GRAPHIC (WINDOW, BITMAP, or control) is first selected as the current GRAPHIC target, then operations are done on it without requiring it to be identified again. Contrast this with the GDI API approach, where the Device Context handle is required for every drawing operation.

It is not necessary when using the PB GRAPHIC statements to define a brush or pen as a separate entity, nor is it necessary to redraw the GRAPHIC target (when in view) in response to Windows messages such as WM_PAINT and WM_ERASEBKGND. GRAPHIC targets are persistent.

When GRAPHIC targets are attached, a REDRAW option can be specified which buffers the results of drawing operations until they are specifically requested. Using this technique reduces flicker in a similar way to the technique of drawing on memory DCs  when using the GDI API.

Pixel operations are possible using the GRAPHIC GET|SET PIXEL statements, in a manner similar to GetPixel/SetPixel of the GDI API. GRAPHIC GET BITS allows the entire bitmap to be loaded into a dynamic string. This can be manipulated either as a string or by mapping an array onto it. It can be placed back into the GRAPHIC target by GRAPHIC SET BITS.

Complementarity of GRAPHIC statements and the Windows GDI API
The GRAPHIC statements contain all the commonly used GDI API functions, but if you need one that is not included it is possible to obtain the hDC of any GRAPHIC target and thereby use GDI API functions on it.

User community
PowerBASIC provides an online forum for users to ask questions and share knowledge. On 8 July 2012 the forum had 5,623 members (only a fraction of them still active) and contained 50,093 threads comprising 408,642 posts since August 26, 1998. The Source Code section alone contained 3,768 threads.

References

External links
  PowerBASIC company website
 PowerBASIC Peer Support Community
 Börje Hagsten's Files
 Don Dickinson's PowerBASIC code
 Gary Beene's gbSnippets
 FreeBase's Page on PowerBASIC (archived 2014)
 TheirCorp's PowerBASIC projects on SourceForge
 PowerBASIC for Beginners YouTube channel
 Borland Turbo Basic 1.x - Stats, Downloads and Screenshots :: WinWorld - Abandonware and Pre-Release Software
 Books on Internet Archive:
 Using Turbo Basic Frederick E. Mosher & David I. Schneider.
 Borland Turbo BASIC Owners Handbook 1987. Borland.

Third-party support
 Computer Workshop (EZGUI)
 Theo's Forum: José Roca Software
 PlanetSquires Forums

BASIC compilers
BASIC programming language family
Borland software
DOS software
Articles with example BASIC code